Navajeevana (Kannada: ನವಜೀವನ) is a 1964 Indian Kannada film, directed by P. S. Murthy and produced by Vadira and Jawahar. The film stars K. S. Ashwath, R. N. Sudarshan, Narasimharaju and Rathnakar in the lead roles. The film has musical score by Rajan–Nagendra.

Cast

K. S. Ashwath
R. N. Sudarshan
Narasimharaju
Rathnakar
Basavaraj
Chindodi Shivaraj
Krishna Shastry
Girimaji
Vadiraj
Pandari Bai
Revath
Chindodi Leela
Mynavathi in Guest Appearance
Suryakala in Guest Appearance
B. Jayashree in Guest Appearance
Ramadevi in Guest Appearance
Rama in Guest Appearance
Harini in Guest Appearance
R. Nagendra Rao in Guest Appearance
Kemparaj Urs in Guest Appearance
G. V. Shivaraj in Guest Appearance
Veerabhadrappa in Guest Appearance
Suryakumar in Guest Appearance
Hanumanthachar in Guest Appearance
Subbanna in Guest Appearance
Madhu in Guest Appearance
Babu in Guest Appearance

Soundtrack
The music was composed by Rajan–Nagendra.

References

External links
 
 

1964 films
1960s Kannada-language films
Films scored by Rajan–Nagendra